Nicole Guilini (born 22 September 1936) is a Belgian former freestyle swimmer. She competed in the women's 4 × 100 metre freestyle relay at the 1952 Summer Olympics.

References

External links
 

1936 births
Living people
Belgian female freestyle swimmers
Olympic swimmers of Belgium
Swimmers at the 1952 Summer Olympics
Sportspeople from West Flanders